Royal Bank Building or Royal Bank Tower may refer to:

Australia
Royal Bank of Queensland, Maryborough, a heritage-listed building in Queensland

Canada

 Toronto, Ontario
Royal Bank Building (Toronto), a name used for two different office buildings in the Toronto's Financial District
Royal Bank Plaza, a Toronto office complex which serves as the de facto headquarters of the Royal Bank of Canada
 Montreal, Quebec
Old Royal Bank Building, Montreal, a Montreal building that served as the head office of the Royal Bank of Canada from 1928 to 1962
Place Ville-Marie, a Montreal office complex also known as the Royal Bank Tower due to its main tenant
 Ottawa, Ontario
Thomas D'Arcy McGee Building, an office building in Ottawa originally called Royal Bank Centre
 Vancouver
Royal Centre (Vancouver), an office building in Vancouver also known as RBC Tower or Royal Bank Tower
Royal Bank Tower (Vancouver), an office building in Vancouver also referred to as Royal Bank Tower
 Victoria, British Columbia
Royal Bank Building (Victoria, British Columbia), a historic building

See also
Royal Bank of Canada
Royal Bank of Queensland